Chérine Mroue (born 5 October 1995), known mononymously as Chérine, is a Belgian singer and songwriter.

Early life 
Mroue was born on 5 October 1995 in Edegem, Antwerp to a Belgian mother and a Lebanese father. When she was three years old, her father abandoned the family and returned to Lebanon. He died in 2022. Mroue was raised bilingually and is fluent in Dutch, French and English. At a young age, she was diagnosed with attention deficit hyperactivity disorder (ADHD).

Career
She advanced to the live shows of the competition, but was eliminated before the final. In 2019, she auditioned for the eighth season of the French version of The Voice, but none of the judges turned around. In 2022, she auditioned again with the song "Drivers License" by Olivia Rodrigo. This time, all four judges turned around. She was eliminated in the Cross Battles round. Later that year, Mroue was a finalist in the Belgian singing competition Rising Star organised by the radio station MNM.

In November 2022, Mroue was announced as one of seven participants in Eurosong 2023, the Belgian national selection for the Eurovision Song Contest 2023. Her entry "" finished in fourth place with 268 points in the final on 14 January 2023. The song was co-written with William Rousseau and François Welgryn and is about her ADHD, which, according to Mroue, makes her get bored easily.

Discography

Singles

References 

1995 births
Living people
21st-century Belgian women singers
21st-century Belgian singers
Belgian people of Lebanese descent
Belgian pop singers
Belgian women singer-songwriters
French-language singers of Belgium
People from Edegem
The Voice (franchise) contestants